Henri Joseph Bouchard d'Esparbès de Lussan (24 January 1714 - 28 August 1788), marquis d'Aubeterre, baron de Saint-Quentin, was a French general and marshal.

References

1714 births
1788 deaths
Marshals of France